Nelly Rapp – Monster Agent is a 2020 Swedish feature film directed by Amanda Adolfsson. Produced by Jon Nohrstedt and Niklas Larsson, the film stars Matilda Gross, Johan Rheborg, Marianne Mörck, Björn Gustafsson, and Lily Wahlsteen. Based on the titular Swedish children book character Nelly Rapp, the plot follows the story of Nelly who spends autumn break with her uncle Hannibal.

Critics received the film with generally favourable reviews, with praise towards its fast-paced action, humor, and visual presentation. At the 56th Guldbagge Awards, the film received five nominations, including Best Art Direction, Best Actress in a Supporting Role, and Best Original Score, winning for Best Costume Design and Best Makeup and Hair.

Plot

The plot follows Nelly, a 10-year old who has no friends. Nelly and her dog London, decide to spend the autumn holidays with her eccentric uncle Hannibal. Hannibal lives in a spooky mansion in the country, with housekeeper Lena-Sleva. However, Nelly does not know that Hannibal does not live a normal life and that he is a monster agent. She is soon surrounded by vampires, ghosts, werewolves, and Frankenstein, and embarks on an adventure where everything she previously believed in is put to test.

Cast

Reception
Contemporary critics praised the film for its fast-paced action, humor, and visual presentation. Sydsvenskan critic Oscar Westerholm described Nelly Rapp – Monster Agent as "an atmospheric, well-made and at times genuinely beautiful thriller which, despite the intended target group being ten-year-olds, on several occasions got a weather-beaten old horror film addict as signed to jump in the cinema armchair". Helena Lindblad of Dagens Nyheter agreed and viewed it as "a colorful, imaginative and fast-paced film with a big warm heart that beats for everyone who does not really fit in." Hynek Pallas, in his piece for Göteborgs-Posten believed that although the film is "transformed into a series of varying quality, the message remains the same". Writing for Aftonbladet, Stefan Hedmark called the film a "cozy autumn rush", elaborating that it is "just right scary for the little ones and a wonderful mix of sweet and salty among the Halloween sweets". In a more critical review, Svenska Dagbladets Jon Asp criticized the film saying that it lacked the aspects of a thriller.

At the 56th Guldbagge Awards, Nelly Rapp – Monster Agent received five nominations, including Best Art Direction, Best Actress in a Supporting Role, and Best Original Score, winning for Best Costume Design and Best Makeup and Hair.

References

External links
 

2020s Swedish-language films
Swedish children's films